Kevin Challenger (born May 4, 1982) is a former professional Canadian football wide receiver. He was released by the Edmonton Eskimos of the Canadian Football League on June 24, 2010. He was drafted by the Calgary Stampeders in the second round of the 2007 CFL Draft. He played college football for the Boston College Eagles. Before that, he played for the Vanier College Cheetahs.
Kevin Challenger also holds an annual football camp for up and coming football players in Montreal, Quebec it is held for 2 days.

External links
Boston College Eagles Bio
Edmonton Eskomos Bio

1982 births
Living people
American football wide receivers
Boston College Eagles football players
Calgary Stampeders players
Canadian football wide receivers
Canadian players of American football
Anglophone Quebec people
Edmonton Elks players
Canadian football people from Montreal
Players of Canadian football from Quebec